A stock exchange cooperative or stock exchange co-operative is a collectively operated business entity that has shares of capital held by an individual or organization and the shares can be publicly bought or sold similar way as in public companies. It is a business entity that is available in Finland. Starting the stock exchange cooperatives has been possible since 2013 the Co-operatives Act. In Finnish language stock exchange cooperative is named pörssiosuuskunta and in Finlandssvenska it is called börsandelslag. Stock exchange cooperatives have some structural governing differences regarding standard co-operatives in Finland. For instance, the use of representatives (a person authorized by the client) in the cooperative assembly cannot be limited which can be done in  the standard Finnish cooperatives. Zero stock exchange co-operatives have been started as of 2021.

References

Cooperative movement
Society of Finland